Walton is an unincorporated community and census-designated place in Lancaster County, Nebraska, United States. Walton had a population of 306 as of the 2010 census. The headquarters of the Cornhusker Council of the Boy Scouts of America are located in Walton.

History
The first and only post office in Walton was established in 1880. The community was named for A. Walton, a pioneer settler.

Geography
Walton is in eastern Lancaster County, just east of the city limits of Lincoln, the state capital. U.S. Route 34 is the northern border of the CDP; the highway leads west  to the center of Lincoln and east  to Union.

It is drained by Stevens Creek, which forms the eastern boundary of the CDP and flows north to Salt Creek, a northeast-flowing tributary of the Platte River.

Demographics 

Walton has a population of 306 people with a median age of 52. The population is 51.3% male (157) and 48.7% female (149). Walton is 97.4% White (298), 1.6% African American or Black (5), 0.7% American Indian or Alaska Native (2), and 1.6% Asian (5).

Education
It is in the Waverly School District 145.

References

Unincorporated communities in Lancaster County, Nebraska
Census-designated places in Nebraska
Census-designated places in Lancaster County, Nebraska
Unincorporated communities in Nebraska